Palmatolepis is an extinct conodont genus in the family Palmatolepidae. It was the most abundant genus of conodonts of the Late Devonian, disappearing during the Devonian/Carboniferous crisis.

Species 
 †Palmatolepis glabra
 †Palmatolepis hassi
 †Palmatolepis khaensis Savage 2013
 †Palmatolepis marki Savage 2013
 †Palmatolepis spallettae
 †Palmatolepis subperlobata
 †Palmatolepis subperlobata lapoensis Savage 2013
 †Palmatolepis triangularis
 †Palmatolepis unicornis

Use in stratigraphy 
The Famennian (372.2 ± 1.6 mya) is defined by a GSSP Golden Spike located at Coumiac quarry, Montagne Noire, France where there is a biologic abundant occurrence of Palmatolepis triangularis.

During that stage, a biologic event occurred (Upper Kellwasser Extinction of all Ancyrodella and Ozarkodina and most Palmatolepis, Polygnathus and Ancyrognathus.

References 

 Morphological variation of Palmatolepis Devonian conodonts: species versus genus. Catherine Girard, Sabrina Renaud and Aurélie Sérayet, Comptes Rendus Palevol, Volume 3, Issue 1, January 2004, Pages 1–8,  (article in French)
 Shape Analysis of Frasnian Species of the Late Devonian Conodont Genus Palmatolepis. Gilbert Klapper and C. T. Foster, Jr., Memoir (The Paleontological Society), Vol. 32, Supplement to Vol. 67, no. 4 of the Journal of Paleontology (Jul., 1993), pages 1–35 (Stable URL, retrieved 2 May 2016)

External links 

  
 Palmatolepis at fossilworks.org (retrieved 2 May 2016)

Ozarkodinida genera
Devonian conodonts
Late Devonian fish
Late Devonian animals
Late Devonian genus extinctions
Taxa named by Klaus J. Müller
Paleozoic life of Ontario